Maria Antonia is a feminine Portuguese given name from the root names Miriam and Antonius. Notable people referred to by this name include the following:

 Maria Antonia of Austria (1669–1692) daughter of Leopold I, Holy Roman Emperor and Margarita Teresa of Austria 
 Maria Antonia Pereira (1700–1760), Spanish discalced carmelite, founder of the carmelite convent of Santiago de Compostela.
 Duchess Maria Antonia of Bavaria (1724–1780) daughter of Charles VII, Holy Roman Emperor and Maria Amalia of Austria
 Maria Antonia Ferdinanda of Spain (1729–1785) daughter of Philip V of Spain and Elisabetta Farnese
 Maria Antonia Josepha Johanna of Austria, birthname of Marie Antoinette, (1755–1793) daughter of Francis I, Holy Roman Emperor and Empress Maria Theresa
 Countess Maria Antonia of Waldstein-Wartenberg (1771–1854) mother of Maria Antonia Koháry de Csábrág
 Princess Maria Antonia of Parma (1774–1841) daughter of Ferdinand I of Parma and Maria Amalia of Austria
 Princess Maria Antonia of Naples and Sicily (1784–1806) daughter of Ferdinand I of the Two Sicilies and Maria Carolina of Austria
 Princess Maria Antonia Koháry (1797–1862) daughter of Ferencz József Koháry de Csábrág and Maria Antonia of Waldstein-Wartenberg
 Princess Maria Antonia of the Two Sicilies (1814–1898) daughter of Francis I of the Two Sicilies and Maria Isabella of Spain
 Archduchess Maria Antonia of Austria (1858–1883) daughter of Ferdinand IV, Grand Duke of Tuscany and Anna of Saxony
 Infanta Maria Antonia of Portugal (1862–1959) daughter of Miguel I of Portugal and Adelaide of Löwenstein-Wertheim-Rosenberg
 Maria Antonia of Austria (1874–1891) daughter of Archduke Karl Salvator of Austria and Maria Immaculata of Bourbon-Two Sicilies
 Maria Antonia of the Two Sicilies (1898–1957) daughter of Prince Ferdinand Pius, Duke of Calabria and Princess Maria Ludwiga Theresia of Bavaria
 Archduchess Maria Antonia of Austria (1899–1977) daughter of Archduke Leopold Salvator of Austria and Infanta Blanca of Spain
Maria Antonia Braile (Fl. 1917), Italian-arbëreshë writer
 María Antonia García Vidal de Santo Silas or María África Gracia Vidal, the birthnames credited to Maria Montez (1912 – 1951), Dominican actress
Maria Antónia Teixeira Rosa, birthname of Mia Rose (born 1988), English-born singer-songwriter

See also

Mariantonia Samà
Marie Antoinette (disambiguation)
María Antonieta, name list
María Antonietta, name list
Maria Antonina, name list
Maria Antonescu
Maria Antonio of Vicenza
Maria Antoniou

Notes